Jacob Kingston (born 21 November 1997) is a Ghanaian professional footballer who plays as a midfielder for Ghanaian Premier League side Accra Great Olympics.

Career

Early career 
Kingston started his career at Ghana Division Two League side KingStep FC, a club founded by his father Laryea Kingston and compatriot Stephen Appiah.

Great Olympics 
In February 2021, there were rumours that Kingston and Rodney Appiah, the son of Ghanaian international footballer Stephen Appiah were on the verge of joining Nungua-based team Accra Great Olympics. The duo joined the team in March 2021, during the second transfer period ahead of the second round of the 2020–21 Ghana Premier League season. On 16 June 2021, Kingston made his professional debut after coming on in the 89th minute for Kwabena Boateng to make a cameo appearance in a 1–0 away loss to King Faisal Babes.

Personal life 
He is the son of former Ghanaian football international Laryea Kingston.

References

External links 

 

Living people
1997 births
Association football midfielders
Ghanaian footballers
Accra Great Olympics F.C. players
Ghana Premier League players